Escape Maker is the fourth studio album by Azalia Snail, released in 1995 by Garden of Delights.

Track listing

Personnel 
Adapted from Escape Maker liner notes.

 Azalia Snail – vocals, guitar, xylophone, production, recording

Release history

References

External links 
 Escape Maker at Discogs (list of releases)

1995 albums
Azalia Snail albums